Palepu  may refer to:
 17970 Palepu, a main belt asteroid
 Krishna G. Palepu, Ross Graham Walker Professor of business administration and Senior Associate Dean for international development